Burnham-on-Crouch railway station is on the Crouch Valley Line in the East of England, serving the town of Burnham-on-Crouch, Essex. The Engineer's Line Reference for the line is WIS; the station's three-letter station code is BUU. The platform has an operational length for eight-coach trains. It is located near the Mangapps Railway Museum.

The line and station were opened on 1 June 1889 for goods and on 1 October 1889 for passenger services by the Great Eastern Railway in 1889. The station had two platforms both with station buildings and connected by a footbridge. A 24-lever signal box was located on the north of the line to the west of the station; this was closed on 21 January 1967. There were sidings and a goods shed to the west of the station. The line and station were passed to the London and North Eastern Railway following the Grouping of 1923. It then passed to the Eastern Region of British Railways upon nationalisation in 1948. The north platform was closed by 1969. When sectorisation was introduced, Burnham-on-Crouch was served by Network SouthEast until the privatisation of British Rail. The line was electrified using 25 kV overhead line electrification (OLE) on 12 May 1986.

Today the station is managed by Greater Anglia, which also operates all trains serving it.

Services
On Sundays, the service is reduced to hourly.

References

External links

History of the Crouch Valley Line 
Local information about Crouch Valley Line

Railway stations in Essex
DfT Category D stations
Former Great Eastern Railway stations
Railway stations in Great Britain opened in 1889
Greater Anglia franchise railway stations
Burnham-on-Crouch
William Neville Ashbee railway stations